William Morice was Archdeacon of Armagh in 1365: he appears again in 1369.

Notes

14th-century Irish Roman Catholic priests
Archdeacons of Armagh